2004 Ai (stylized as 2004 A.I.)  is the third studio album by Japanese-American singer-songwriter Ai, released on June 16, 2004, by Def Jam Japan and Universal Sigma. 2004 Ai was Ai's first top 10 album, as well as her first album to be certified by the Recording Industry Association of Japan.

Background 

Ai previously released her second studio album, Original Ai in 2003. The album was a commercial success compared to her debut under RCA, My Name Is Ai, selling 20 times her debut album's amount and peaking at number 15 on Oricon's albums chart.

Two singles were released prior to the album, "After the Rain" and "EO," both of which were top 30 hits. "EO" was her highest charting single to date, reaching number 23.

Writing and production 

The majority of the album was produced by R&B producers 813 (DJ Yutaka and Shingo. S), 2Soul, Daisuke Imai, T. Kura and Michico. Ai had worked with 813 and Michico on Original Ai, on the songs "Summer Time" and "Girls' Talk" respectively. "Dreaming of You" was a collaboration with Danish music production duo Great Dane, i.e. Carsten Lindberg and Joachim Svare, with new Japanese lyrics written by Ai. Ai had previously worked with the pair on her single "Thank U."

Ai collaborated with several musicians on the album, most notably beat-boxer Afra and rapper Tucker on the single "Watch Out!" She also collaborated with 1970s guitarist Char, who arranged the song "Breathe." The collaboration occurred because Ai happened to be childhood friends with Char's son, vocalist Jesse from the rock band Rize. The pair later collaborated vocally on Char's DVD single "No Generation Gap" (2004), which was featured on Ai's album Feat. Ai. Ai also collaborated with reggae artist Boy-Ken on "Angel." Boy-Ken released an alternative version of "Angel" on his album Everythin' Is Everythin''' (2004). The interlude "L'Haleine des Cordes" is a classical piece arranged by game music composer Shirō Sagisu.

 Promotion and concerts

The album received several minor commercial tie-ups. "After the Rain" was used as the Fuji TV music show Hey! Hey! Hey! Music Champ's January to April 2004 ending theme song. "EO" was use as the TV Tokyo music show Japan Countdown's May 2004 ending theme song. "Watch Out!" was used in TV commercials for the PlayStation game True Crime: Streets of LA.

An English version of the song "Alive" was used as an insert song for the South Korean drama Delightful Girl Choon-Hyang.

Ai supported the album with two tours, the 15 date 2004 Ai Club Tour between May and August 2004, and the 10 date 2004 Ai Japan Tour in September and October 2004. Ai also performed at the 2004 MTV Buzz Asia Concert in Seoul, South Korea, as well as the Taipei Music Festival to promote the album. Footage from the Taiwan concert, the club tour and the concert tour were compiled to create Ai's first live DVD, Machigainai.

 Critical reception 

The reviewers at CDJournal felt the album had a lot more personality than Original Ai. (2003) They felt the album's sound did not show the "frailty" of other popular R&B acts, and noted the album's "strong beats" and the lyrics from a female viewpoint. "After the Rain" was called "bewitching," and that the song's "sticky with emotion melody wraps the song in a mellow atmosphere." The reviewers felt that Ai's "pressingly questioning" rap in "Watch Out!" showed a high level of technique.

The music videos were well received at music awards shows. At the 2004 MTV Video Music Awards Japan, "After the Rain" was nominated for the Best Buzz Asia - Japan award. Ai also received two nominations at the 2005 MTV Video Music Awards Japan, best R&B video for "EO," and best collaboration for "Watch Out." In 2005 at the Space Shower Music Video Awards, she won the best female video award for "Watch Out."

 Chart performance 

The album debuted at number three in Japan, selling 36,000 copies. It became a long charting album, selling three times its first week total (113,000) over 17 weeks. At the time, this was Ai's most successful release, and it became her first release to receive a certification by the RIAJ (gold). As of 2012, it remains her fourth most commercially successful album in Japan.

 Track listing 

Personnel

Personnel details were sourced from 2004 Ais liner notes booklet.ManagerialAi – executive producer
Yuki Arai – co-executive producer
Kay Ichikawa – publisher
Aiichiro Kiyohara – A&R director
Kaz Koike – co-executive producer
Toshiharu Kojima – co-executive producer
Shinki Miura – co-executive producer

Atsushi Nakaue – publisher
Kenya "Malu.k" Orita – executive producer (#15, #17)
Koichi Sakakibara – artist management
Tamotsu Suzuki – recording coordinator (#6, #16)
Akira Terabayashi – co-executive producer
Kumi Kawasumi Yoshida – publisherPerformance credits2Soul – instruments (#2, #9)
Afra – human beatbox, vocals (#12)
Ai – vocals, background vocals
Aaron Blackmon – bass (#4)
Boy-Ken – vocals (#10)
Dave Burnett – bass (#2, #8)
Char – acoustic guitar (#6)
Kim Hanson – additional keyboard, string arrangement(#15, #17)
Daisuke Imai – instruments (#7, #11)
T. Kura – instruments (#3-#4)

Carsten Lindsberg – instruments (#15, #17)
Michico – background vocals (#3)
Wilson Montuori – guitars (#2, #8)
Royal Mirrorball Orchestra – strings (#5-#6)
Royal Mirrorball Sextet – strings (#16)
Shirō Sagisu – keyboards (#6, #16)
James Spears – keyboard (#8)
Joachim Svare – instruments (#15, #17)
Tucker – bass, electone, guitar, keyboard, vocals (#12)Visuals and imageryEito Furukubo – hair, make-up
Noriko Goto – stylist

Misato Kumamoto – art direction, design
Cassio Macambira – photographerTechnical and production'''

2Soul – arrangement, production (#1-#2, #8-#9)
813 – arrangement, production (#10, #13-#14)
Afra – production (#12)
Ai – production (#12)
Junya Endo – mixing (#11)
Akitomo Fukushima – recording assistance (#3-#4)
Bruce Gowdy – mixing assistant (#10, #14)
Daisuke Imai – arrangement, instrument recording, production (#7, #11)
Masahiro Kawagucchi – mixing (#12), mixing engineer (#6, #16), Pro Tools digital editing (#6, #16), recording engineer (#6, #16)
T. Kura – arrangement, mixing, production (#3-#4)
Yukihiro Kusuru – co-engineering, co-mixing (#7)
Carsten Lindsberg – arrangement, mixing, producer (#15, #17)
Yasuji "Yasman" Maeda – mastering, mastering engineer (#16)
Minako Nozue – assistant engineer (#6, #16)

Tetsuya Ochiai – concert master (#6, #16)
Taiji Okuda – vocal recording (#10-#12)
Kenya "Malu.k" Orita – vocal recording (#15, #17)
Shirō Sagisu – arrangement (#5-#6, #16), drum programming (#6, #16)
Tatsuya Sato – editing (#2, #8-#9), engineering (#2, #8-#9), mixing (#2, #8-#9), vocal recording (#2, #9)
Mitsuru "Boo" Shibamoto – assistant engineer (#2, #9), engineering (#15, #17), vocal recording (#8, #14)
Troy Stanton – mixing (#10, #14)
Joachim Svare – arrangement, mixing, producer (#15, #17)
Tomotaka Takehara – engineering, mixing (#7)
Tucker – production (#12)
Mineo Watanabe – recording (#3)
Haruo Yoda – production (#6, #16)

Charts and sales

Sales and certifications

Release history

References 

2004 albums
Ai (singer) albums
Japanese-language albums
Universal Music Group albums
Def Jam Japan albums